Didier Tholot (born 2 April 1964) is a French former professional footballer who turned to management in 2002, and is currently manager of Pau FC. Whilst at Bordeaux he played in the 1996 UEFA Cup Final.

Playing career
Tholot was born in Feurs, Loire, Auvergne-Rhône-Alpes. After completing his training at INF Vichy in 1984, Tholot signed his first professional contract with Sporting Club Toulon in the first division where he learned the ropes during three years. He was then transferred to Chamois Niortais F.C. where he played for two seasons.

In 1990 he was recruited by Stade de Reims. In spite of the club's financial difficulties eventually leading to relegation at the end of the season, Tholot scored 14 goals in 34 competitive matches. The following season he was recruited by AS Saint-Étienne on a two-year contract but, given less playing time in his second season, moved on to FC Martigues who were freshly promoted from Division 2. With 27 goals to his credit over two seasons, he was noticed by FC Girondins de Bordeaux to play forward of Zinedine Zidane, Christophe Dugarry and Bixente Lizarazu.

With Bordeaux Tholot's career reached its pinnacle. He scored the first goal of a famous second-leg home comeback victory over the great A.C. Milan of 1996 (3-0). This team went on to reach the final of the 1996 UEFA Cup Final and to play the final of the Coupe de la Ligue the following season, with Tholot then partnering Jean-Pierre Papin up front.

Tholot finished his playing career in Switzerland, first with FC Sion in 1997, then with FC Basel, BSC Young Boys and finally FC Vevey-Sports 05 where he spent his final season taking on the role of player-coach.

Coaching career
Following an auspicious coaching debut at FC Vevey-Sports 05, Tholot was hired by Sion of the Swiss first division. He then moved on to manage Libourne Saint-Seurin for three seasons, notably achieving promotion to Ligue 2 in his first season.

Tholot's next move to Reims was short-lived as he was replaced by Luis Fernández in December 2008. In April 2009 Tholot embarked on his second stint with Sion in order to save the club from the drop. Not only did the team avoid relegation that year but it also won the Swiss Cup. Tholot left the club at the end of the following season.

In June 2010, Tholot took on the managerial duties of LB Châteauroux where, in spite of severe financial restrictions, he managed to keep the club in Ligue 2 for three seasons. He left the club in October 2012.

In May 2014 he became Assistant Manager to Claude Makélélé at first division SC Bastia. When Makélélé was sacked in November 2008, Tholot declined the top job out of "loyalty".

In December 2014 he returned to FC Sion for a third spell. As in 2009, the club avoided relegation and again won the Swiss Cup against FC Basel on its opponent's home ground. During the 2015–16 season, Sion qualified for the round of 16 of the UEFA Europa League, making it out of the group stage in a pool also including Liverpool, Bordeaux and Rubin Kazan. Tholot left Sion 12 August 2016.

In April 2018, Tholot was appointed manager of AS Nancy, who were struggling near the bottom of Ligue 2. Although he was successful in saving the club from relegation, a poor start to the 2018–19 season saw him removed from the post in October.

After eighteen months away from management, Tholot was appointed by newly promoted Pau FC on 18 May 2020, in preparation for the new season.

Honours

As a player
Bordeaux
 UEFA Intertoto Cup: 1995
 Coupe de la Ligue runner up:1997

As a manager
FC Sion
Swiss Cup: 2008–09, 2014–15
 UEFA Europa League, qualifying for the last 16: 2015–16 
Libourne Saint-Seurin
 Promotion to Ligue 2: 2005–06

External links

External links

Didier Tholot's website

1964 births
Living people
People from Feurs
Sportspeople from Loire (department)
Association football forwards
French footballers
Ligue 2 players
Ligue 1 players
Swiss Super League players
SC Toulon players
Chamois Niortais F.C. players
Stade de Reims players
AS Saint-Étienne players
FC Martigues players
FC Girondins de Bordeaux players
FC Sion players
Walsall F.C. players
FC Basel players
BSC Young Boys players
French football managers
FC Sion managers
Stade de Reims managers
LB Châteauroux managers
AS Nancy Lorraine managers
Pau FC managers
French expatriate sportspeople in Switzerland
Expatriate football managers in Switzerland
Expatriate footballers in Switzerland
INF Vichy players
Footballers from Auvergne-Rhône-Alpes